Raúl Bautista Dáel (born October 10, 1966) is a Filipino Roman Catholic clergyman who is currently the Bishop of the Diocese of Tandag.

Early life and priesthood
He was born in Jasaan, Misamis Oriental on October 10, 1966.After graduating at Xavier University, he studied theology at the Saint John Vianney Seminary of Theology in Cagayan de Oro City.

At 26, he was ordained priest for the Archdiocese of Cagayan de Oro in June 1993. He began his priestly ministry as Parochial Vicar of the Metropolitan Cathedral. In 1995 he was reassigned as Parochial Administrator of St Peter the Apostle parish located in Sugbongcon in Misamis Oriental.

In 2016 he was appointed as vicar for the Clergy of the archdiocese of Cagayan de Oro.

Episcopacy
On February 26, 2018 Pope Francis accepted the resignation of Bishop Nereo Odchimar and subsequently appointed Father Raul Dael as Bishop of Tandag.

Bishop Dael was consecrated by Archbishop Cardinal Luis Antonio Tagle of Manila with Cagayan de Oro Archbishop Antonio Ledesma and Bishop-Emeritus Nereo Odchimar as co-consecrators on June 7, 2018. He took possession of the diocese on June 14, 2018.

References

21st-century Roman Catholic bishops in the Philippines
1966 births
Living people
People from Misamis Oriental
Visayan people